Al Azariq District  is a district of the Dhale Governorate, Yemen. As of 2003, the district had a population of 37,295 inhabitants.

References

Districts of Dhale Governorate